Dresher is a surname. Notable people with the surname include:

Melvin Dresher (1911–1992), Polish-born American mathematician
Paul Dresher (born 1951), American composer

See also
 Drescher